Palash Das is a Bangladeshi singer and entrepreneur. He is known as Palash in the entertainment arena of Bangladesh.

Biography
Palash established a band titled Orbit in 90s. His first single album was Premer Thikana. His 38 single albums were published. He is a playback singer too. He sang more than 1500 songs for films.

Palash's album Vul Korechhi Valobese was published in 2002. This album had a song titled "Ma Tumi Amar Age Jeyo Nako More". Later this song was used in a film titled Khodar Pore Ma. For this song he was awarded Bangladesh National Film Award for Best Male Playback Singer in 2012.

References

Living people
Bangladeshi playback singers
21st-century Bangladeshi male singers
21st-century Bangladeshi singers
Best Male Playback Singer National Film Award (Bangladesh) winners
Year of birth missing (living people)
20th-century Bangladeshi male singers
20th-century Bangladeshi singers